Felipe Campos may refer to:

 Felipe Campos (Brazilian footballer) (born 1981), Brazilian football attacking midfielder
 Felipe Campos (Chilean footballer) (born 1993), Chilean football defender